2328 Robeson, provisional designation , is a background asteroid from the inner regions of the asteroid belt, approximately  in diameter. It was discovered on 19 April 1972, by astronomer Soviet–Russian Tamara Smirnova at the Crimean Astrophysical Observatory in Nauchnij, on the Crimean peninsula. It was named after American actor and singer Paul Robeson. The C/X-type asteroid has a rotation period of 18.6 hours.

Orbit and classification 

Robeson is a non-family asteroid from the main belt's background population. It orbits the Sun in the inner main-belt at a distance of 2.0–2.7 AU once every 3 years and 7 months (1,308 days; semi-major axis of 2.34 AU). Its orbit has an eccentricity of 0.15 and an inclination of 10° with respect to the ecliptic. The body's observation arc begins with its official discovery observation at Nauchnij in April 1972.

Physical characteristics 

In the SMASS classification Robeson is a carbonaceous C-type asteroid. It has also been characterized as an X-type asteroid by Pan-STARRS photometric survey.

Rotation period 

In December 2006, a rotational lightcurve of Robeson was obtained from photometric observations at the Leura  and Hunters Hill  observatories in Australia. Lightcurve analysis gave a rotation period of 18.632 hours with a brightness amplitude of 0.20 magnitude.

Diameter and albedo 

According to the surveys carried out by the Infrared Astronomical Satellite IRAS, the Japanese Akari satellite and the NEOWISE mission of NASA's Wide-field Infrared Survey Explorer, Robeson measures between 11.75 and 13.30 kilometers in diameter and its surface has an albedo between 0.06 and 0.1281.

The Collaborative Asteroid Lightcurve Link assumes it to be a stony asteroid with a standard albedo of 0.20 and calculates a diameter of 7.46 kilometers based on an absolute magnitude of 13.0.

Naming 

This minor planet was named after in memory of African-American singer and actor Paul Robeson (1898–1976). The official naming citation was published by the Minor Planet Center on 8 February 1982.

References

External links 
 Asteroid Lightcurve Database (LCDB), query form (info )
 Dictionary of Minor Planet Names, Google books
 Asteroids and comets rotation curves, CdR – Observatoire de Genève, Raoul Behrend
 Discovery Circumstances: Numbered Minor Planets (1)-(5000) – Minor Planet Center
 
 

002328
Discoveries by Tamara Mikhaylovna Smirnova
Named minor planets
002328
19720419
Paul Robeson